"Do Lord Remember Me" (also known as "Do Lord" or "Oh Do Lord, Oh Do Lord"), Roud 11971, is a 19th-century African-American Spiritual.

Recordings
Notable recordings include:

 Jimmie Strothers
 Mississippi John Hurt
 Johnny Cash

African-American spiritual songs
19th-century songs
Songwriter unknown
Year of song unknown